Beni Rached, Chlef is a town and commune in Chlef Province, Algeria. According to the 1998 census it has a population of 21,069.

References

Communes of Chlef Province
Chlef Province